Natalia Montiel (born 17 November 1985) is an Argentine badminton player. She won the women's doubles National circuit title in 2013, and in the mixed doubles in 2016.

Achievements

BWF International Challenge/Series 
Mixed doubles

  BWF International Challenge tournament
  BWF International Series tournament
  BWF Future Series tournament

References

External links 
 

Living people
1985 births
Argentine female badminton players